Ilex cassine is a holly native to the southeastern coast of North America, in the United States from Virginia to southeast Texas, in Mexico in Veracruz, and in the Caribbean on the Bahamas, Cuba, and Puerto Rico. It is commonly known as dahoon holly or cassena, the latter derived from the Timucua name for I. vomitoria.

It is a large shrub or small tree growing to 10–13 m tall. The leaves are evergreen, 6–15 cm long and 2–4 cm broad, glossy dark green, entire or with a few small spines near the apex of the leaf. The flowers are white, with a four-lobed corolla. The fruit is a red drupe, 5–6 mm in diameter, containing four seeds.

As with other hollies, it is dioecious with separate male and female plants. Only the females have berries, and a male pollenizer must be within range for bees to pollinate them.

Varieties
There are three varieties:
Ilex cassine var. cassine (United States, Caribbean)
Ilex cassine var. angustifolia Aiton. (United States)
Ilex cassine var. mexicana (Turcz.) Loes. (Mexico)

Ilex × attenuata is a naturally occurring hybrid of Ilex cassine and Ilex opaca.

Cultivation
Ilex cassine is grown in warmer climates as an ornamental plant for the attractive bright red berries set against the glossy green leaves. It is known to grow to 30 feet tall. Its original range was close to the coast, but the range has been extended by planting.

Stimulant
Ilex cassine leaves, like those of its sister species I. vomitoria, contain measurable amounts of the stimulants caffeine and theobromine. The leaves of both species may have been used in the Native American cassena (the Black drink), and there has been confusion in the literature as to which species was commonly used to brew the drink, but I. vomitoria provides more caffeine and was probably the usual ingredient in cassena. An analysis of the levels of methylxanthines in the leaves used in various stimulant drinks found that I. cassine leaves have about 20% (by dry weight) of the amount of caffeine found in I. vomitoria, 8% of that in Coffea arabica, and about 3% of the caffeine in Camellia sinensis Kunze. I. cassine has twice as much theobromine as I. vomitoria and 20% of the level in C. sinensis Kunze (C. arabica does not contain significant amounts of theobromine), but the stimulant effect of theobromine is just 10% of that of caffeine.

References

External links
 
 
 Trees, Shrubs, and Woody Vines of North Carolina: Dahoon (Ilex cassine)
 

cassine
Plants described in 1753
Taxa named by Carl Linnaeus
Ornamental trees
Trees of the Bahamas
Trees of Cuba
Trees of Puerto Rico
Trees of the Southeastern United States
Trees of the South-Central United States
Trees of Veracruz
Trees of the United States